The NDTV Imagine Film Company (also known as the Imagine Film Company) is a 1999 film company founded by Prannoy Roy .  Radhika Roy and Narayan Rao are related to Prannoy Roy and all three of them are the official NDTV Film Company 
key peoples. The Imagine Film Company mostly makes Indian Bollywood films which are usually Animated or 3-d. It also distributed Roadside Romeo, a family animation about street-dogs, and soon will produce the classic animated remake of Kuch Kuch Hota Hai, Koochie Koochie Hota Hai, with Shahrukh Khan, Rani Mukerji, Sanjay Dutt, Kajol, Uday Chopra and Riteish Deshmukh's voice. It will soon also produce the first 3-D family drama called Toonpur Ka Super Hero with Ajay Devgn and Kajol Devgn in lead roles.

Filmography

Controversies
NDTV's infotainment channel NDTV imagine had been criticised by children's rights groups accusing it of "exploitation of infants" in its Reality Show "Pati, Patni aur Woh"(Husband, Wife and the other one), a program inspired by The Baby Borrowers of BBC. National Commission for Protection of Child Rights(NCPCR) and the Women and Child Development ministry (WCD) has asked NDTV Imagine to stop the telecast of this reality show.

NDTV is widely regarded as pro-Congress, the longest ruling party of India.

Latest awards
 NAB 2008 International Broadcasting Excellence Award - NDTV Labs
 CBA-Thomson Foundation Journalist of the Year Award - Sutapa Deb
 CBA-IBC Award for Innovative Engineering - NDTV Labs
husband wife and IT

Notable personalities
 Deepti Sachdeva
 Monideepa Banerjee
 Barkha Dutt
 Natasha Jog
 Sonia Singh
 Nidhi Kulpati
 Nidhi Razdan
 Nitin Gokhale
 Pankaj Pachauri
 Prannoy Roy
 Siddharth Vinayak Patankar
 Vinod Dua
 Vikram A Chandra
 Vishnu Som
 Sonali Chander
 Kismet Singh

References

1. ^ "News Delhi TV". Forbes.com. https://www.webcitation.org/6AvXg1hIZ?url=http://blogs.forbes.com/account/login/?redirect_to=http://blogs.forbes.com/account Retrieved on 2006-09-18. 
2. ^ https://web.archive.org/web/20080523132434/http://www.nabshow.com/2008/press/ibeawards2.asp
3. ^ http://www.cba.org.uk/awards_and_competitions/2008CBABroadcastingAwards.php
4. ^ http://www.cba.org.uk/awards_and_competitions/2008CBABroadcastingAwards.php
5. ^ https://web.archive.org/web/20180820004153/http://www.ndtvlabs.com/
6. ^ https://web.archive.org/web/20120714070744/http://www.ndtvworldwide.com/ Media Consulting

External links
 Official NDTV website
 NDTV Twitter

Film production companies of Delhi
Television production companies of India
NDTV Group
Companies based in New Delhi
Indian companies established in 1999